Molinaranea magellanica is a species of orb-weaver spider (family Araneidae) endemic to Chile, Argentina, the Juan Fernández Islands and the Falkland Islands. It is also known as the Falklands green spider. It is the largest endemic spider known to exist in the Falklands.

Taxonomy
The species was first described in 1847 by Charles Athanase Walckenaer  as Epeira magellanica. It has been described under a large number of synonyms in nine genera. Nine names used by Hercule Nicolet in 1849, including Epeira cinaberina, are now considered to be synonyms.

References

Araneidae
Spiders of South America
Spiders described in 1847